Hot Rod is a 2007 American comedy film directed by Akiva Schaffer (in his directorial debut) and written by Pam Brady. The film stars Andy Samberg as amateur stuntman Rod Kimble, whose stepfather, Frank (Ian McShane), continuously mocks and disrespects him. When Frank becomes ill, Rod raises money for his heart operation by executing his largest stunt yet. The film also stars Jorma Taccone, Sissy Spacek, Will Arnett, Danny McBride, Isla Fisher and Bill Hader.

The film was initially drafted by Pam Brady (who retains full writing credit) as a vehicle for Saturday Night Live star Will Ferrell, but the project never commenced. Lorne Michaels convinced Paramount to let The Lonely Island, which was gaining fame for its work on SNL, take over the film. The group subsequently rewrote the movie with a heavy emphasis on offbeat surreal humor. It was shot in Vancouver in the summer of 2006. The score is by former Yes guitarist Trevor Rabin, and the soundtrack features several songs by the Swedish rock band Europe.

Paramount Pictures released Hot Rod on August 3, 2007. It was a box-office failure, grossing only $14 million on a $25 million budget. As its producers predicted, it received mixed reviews, with critics criticizing the film's script and humor. It has become a popular cult film on home video.

Plot

Throughout his life, Rod Kimble has believed his dead father was a successful and respectable stuntman working for Evel Knievel. He aspires to follow in his father's footsteps and become a famous stuntman himself. Meanwhile, his stepfather, Frank, does not respect Rod as a man, often going out of his way to beat him in sparring sessions and mocking his stuntman dreams. Rod makes many attempts to land jumps with his Tomos moped, most of them unsuccessful. After another failed jump attempt at a public pool, he returns home and learns that Frank is in urgent need of a heart transplant that the family's health insurance will not cover. Angered at the thought of Frank dying without getting a chance to gain his respect, Rod runs into the woods to let out his fury and tumbles down a steep hill, where he sees an inspirational billboard and gets an idea. Rod quickly meets with his childhood friends Rico and Dave and his half-brother Kevin, and tells them he plans to jump over 15 school buses and use the proceeds to fund Frank's surgery. Later, Denise, his neighbor and love interest, joins his team.

To promote his stunt and raise funds, Rod works parties, corporate get-togethers, and other events, performing activities such as taping pillows to his body and having a washing machine suspended by a crane swing to hit him. One day, he gets curious about what Kevin is working on as he hears music coming from his computer. Kevin says he was experimenting with editing footage, and shows Rod the video. Impressed by Kevin's work, Rod gets the idea to release a stuntman film to raise money. Kevin releases the movie using his footage of Rod's stunts and sells several tickets to the screening, where the audience laughs at Rod as the film depicts his failed training attempts. Rod gets angry and throws the theater's projector out of a window, smashing the projectionist's car below. He gives the projectionist all the money he has raised to cover the damages and avoid arrest. Upset, he returns home, where his mother reveals that his biological father was not the stuntman he thought he was. Humiliated, Rod quits the team and his dream to beat Frank, despite his friends' objections, but is reinvigorated when Dave gives him advice that inspires him to apologize to Kevin. As Kevin accepts his apology, he reveals that Rod's stunt footage has grown popular online and that a show on a local AM radio station, hosted by Barry Pasternak, has offered to cover the planned jump's expenses.

Rod gets his friends back together, and they start setting up for the jump. On the day of the event, his friends give him a new suit, a rock representing Rico's extensive pyrotechnic work, and a motorbike. He also receives a kiss from Denise, who broke up with Jonathan, her insensitive and callous boyfriend. As Rod jumps off the ramp, his bike's speed enables him to jump over the buses, but the motorcycle smashes through a stage and goes flying. Rod lands squarely on the ground and has an unconscious out-of-body experience. When he wakes, Rod, with Kevin and Denise's help, triumphantly gets up to applause and sees that the donations have accumulated over $50,000. Six months later, Rod once again spars with Frank, finally gaining the upper hand and Frank's respect.

After the credits, Rod is seen bowing down to his moped with the sunset in the background.

Cast
 Andy Samberg as Rod Kimble
 Jorma Taccone as Kevin Powell
 Bill Hader as Dave McLean
 Danny McBride as Rico Brown
 Isla Fisher as Denise Harris
 Sissy Spacek as Marie Powell
 Ian McShane as Frank Powell
 Will Arnett as Jonathan Ault
 Chris Parnell as Barry Pasternak
 Chester Tam as Richardson
 Mark Acheson as Homeless Dude
 Alvin Sanders as Furious Boss
 Akiva Schaffer as Derek
 Britt Irvin as Cathy Fay
 Brittany Tiplady as Maggie McLean
 Andrew Moxham as Sullivan Tom
 Queens of the Stone Age as Gown

Production

Hot Rod was written by Pam Brady, a former South Park writer, as a project for Will Ferrell during his tenure at Saturday Night Live. The project never commenced, and the script remained in limbo at Paramount Pictures for several years. In the meantime, The Lonely Island was hired at SNL in 2005, and by the end of the year, it had a breakthrough with its short "Lazy Sunday." The sketch, an "SNL Digital Short," received millions of views online (especially on the then-fledgling YouTube), making the trio, especially Samberg, stars. Lorne Michaels, SNLs creator, convinced Paramount to allow the troupe to direct and star in the film. The trio had no prior experience with feature-length films, but Michaels had confidence, envisioning the film as a "different generation's comedy." The studio wanted the film to remain less coarse to obtain a PG-13 rating from the Motion Picture Association of America (MPAA), like DodgeBall: A True Underdog Story (2004).

Initially reluctant, as the script was designed for Ferrell and the summer filming schedule was less than ideal, Paramount authorized a rewrite, allowing the writers to incorporate bizarre, offbeat humor and absurdist comedy. The script had to "match their standards"—"another way of saying, 'just dumb it down'", said Schaffer. This involved deleting comedy designed for Ferrell (which Samberg called "so well-written") and replacing it with their own. "We didn't want it to seem like I was doing a Ferrell impression," said Samberg. The result was a balance between "weird" humor and what Paramount considered accessible. Samberg was inspired by Wet Hot American Summer, which was, according to him, "designed to fuck around with what's expected from a movie." Many jokes from the film deemed "too weird" were cut, including a scene in which Rod "jokingly," asks his younger brother Kevin to pull out his genitalia. Samberg aimed for a performance that was: 
Hot Rod was largely filmed in Vancouver in the summer of 2006. Shooting locations include Cloverdale, British Columbia, and under the Surrey end of the Pattullo Bridge southeast of Vancouver. Other locations in British Columbia include Coquitlam, North Vancouver, Burnaby and Downtown Vancouver. Samberg had a stunt double, but did as many of his own stunts as was allowed.

The MPAA objected to using the word "semen" in a scene in which Chris Parnell reveals a profane tattoo on his stomach. It was changed to "residue." Another scene that barely made it into the film involved Samberg and Taccone repeating the phrase "cool beans" until it evolves into a "bizarre pseudo-rap." Schaffer initially cut the scene, but Samberg and Taccone edited it themselves. Schaffer reinserted the scene in the film's last test screening, where it received high marks from audiences as one of their favorite bits. The film's original poster featured a silhouetted Samberg atop a hill beside his motorbike in a martial-arts pose. Paramount changed the poster to a large close-up of Samberg's face.

Reception
Before its release, the Lonely Island promoted the film with interstitials during Comedy Central movie marathons. In the promos, the trio attempt to convince viewers that Hot Rod is the story of a sex offender ("He does stunts to raise money to sex-offend") and spoof the quality of films run during daytime marathons ("Stay tuned for Teen Wolf Too!"). The premiere was at the John Ford Amphitheatre in Los Angeles.

Samberg predicted the film would not do well, telling Entertainment Weekly, "It will get bad reviews. Comedy is traditionally not reviewed that well." He added that if future generations viewed Hot Rod with a similar reverence to films such as Billy Madison, he would consider it a success.

The "punchdance" term the film introduced was a reference to Footloose.

Commercial performance
The film opened at #9 at the U.S. box office in 2007 and grossed $5.3 million in its opening weekend. Overall, it bombed in theaters, leaving after 68 days, grossing just under $14 million.

Critical reception

Hot Rod received mixed reviews from film critics upon its initial release. On Metacritic, it has an average score of 43 out of 100, based on 27 reviews, indicating "mixed or average reviews". On Rotten Tomatoes, it has a score of 39% from 117 reviews, with an average rating of 4.92/10. The site's consensus reads "Hot Rod has brazen silliness and a few humorous set pieces on its side, but it's far too inconsistent to satisfy all but the least demanding slapstick lovers". After its release, Paper wrote, "Depending on whom you talk to, Hot Rod is either a terrible stinker or a really strange and wonderful movie that you can't believe they got away with making." Audiences polled by CinemaScore gave the film an average grade of B− on an A+ to F scale.

The Hollywood Reporter Frank Scheck criticized the film's "formulaic" script and humor, but commended Samberg's "reasonably engaging and sweet comedic screen presence." "No one seems to have told the Lonely Island boys that the stakes are a little higher in features than they are in music videos and that underlighted shots and sloppy editing are more distracting on the big screen than on television," wrote Marjorie Baumgarten of The Austin Chronicle. Wesley Morris of The Boston Globe called the film "playfully dumb," commenting, "The filmmakers [...] have skipped right past the kitsch of tribute and gone straight for jokey delusion [...] And in that sense, Hot Rod is post-parody, taking nothing seriously, not even being a movie." Peter Travers of Rolling Stone wrote, "The film's low-key Wayne's World vibe takes it only so far. I laughed, then I wished it was funnier, then I just wished it would end. Peter Debruge of Variety called the movie "yet another example of a comedy that refuses to be taken seriously—concept as clothesline for all manner of silliness." Nick Schager of Slant Magazine noted that the trio "care far less about clever plotting than random ridiculousness," deeming the film "a tired rehash of every SNL alum's big-screen debut since Adam Sandler's Billy Madison."

For their part, the film's producers remained optimistic about the movie in the press. "The movies I've always liked, comedy-wise—Billy Madison, The Jerk—always got terrible reviews. When our reviews came in, it was like, 'Oh, we're right on track,'" said Samberg.

Lorne Michaels predicted it would find a different audience in the future:

Chicago Sun-Times critic Roger Ebert gave the film three out of four stars: 

The A.V. Club later wrote that the film differentiated itself from other Michaels comedies: "They may be just as poorly received, but their rhythms are unpredictable and exciting, shocked to life by moments of anti-comedy and wacky deconstruction. Hardcore comedy devotees pick up on them like a dog whistle."

Home media
Hot Rod was released on Region One DVD and HD DVD  on November 27, 2007, and in Region Two in January 2008. It made $24 million on DVD rentals in the United States—46% over its box office gross. It was released on Blu-ray Disc on December 16, 2008, but the disc went out of print on October 11, 2009. The DVD remained in print. Warner Bros. re-released the Blu-ray, which remains in print as part of its deal to distribute Paramount titles.

Soundtrack

The soundtrack was composed by ex-Yes guitarist Trevor Rabin. Several songs by the Swedish rock band Europe are in the movie, including "Cherokee" and "Rock the Night." The trailer contains three Swedish rock songs, Europe's "Cherokee" and "The Final Countdown", and The Hives' "See Through Head". It also includes the UK rock band Test Icicles' "Circle. Square. Triangle" as well as American Hi-Fi's "The Art of Losing." The band called Gown that plays at Rod's final jump is actually Queens of the Stone Age.Track listing'
 "Danger on the Track" – Europe
 "A Gringo Like Me" – Ennio Morricone
 "Never" – Moving Pictures
 "Two of Hearts" – Stacey Q
 "Cherokee" – Europe
 "Skulls" – The Nutley Brass (Written by Glenn Danzig)
 "Street Luge" – Trevor Rabin
 "You're the Voice" – John Farnham
 "Head Honcho" – Gown
 "Chase" – Giorgio Moroder
 "Cool Beans" – Jorma Taccone & Andy Samberg
 "(I Just) Died in Your Arms" – Cutting Crew
 "Dave on Acid" – Trevor Rabin
 "Rock the Night" – Europe
 "Stunt Suite" – Trevor Rabin
 "Time Has Come" – Europe
 "The Real Bass" – Brooklyn Bounce

References

External links

 Official website
 
 
 Official Hot Rod iOS App

The Lonely Island
2007 films
2007 action comedy films
American sports comedy films
Films shot in Vancouver
Paramount Pictures films
American action comedy films
2007 directorial debut films
Films directed by Akiva Schaffer
Films scored by Trevor Rabin
The Lonely Island films
Films produced by Lorne Michaels
Films with screenplays by Pam Brady
2007 comedy films
2000s English-language films
2000s American films